The USPSA Asia Pacific Championship are yearly USPSA matches held by the Philippine Shooters and Match Officers Confederation (PSMOC). The first championship was held in 2016 at the Front Sight Shooting Range, Manila, Philippines. The 2017 USPSA Asia Pacific Championship is set to be held in the second half of 2017.

History 
The first USPSA match in the Philippines was the 2015 Magnus USPSA Christmas Shoot held Thursday to Sunday 10 to 13 December, 2015, with 12 stages at Parang, Marikina. The following year the first USPSA Asia Pacific Championship was held.

 2016 USPSA Asia Pacific Championship: Wednesday to Sunday 20 to 24 July, 24 stages at the Front Sight Shooting Range, Manila, Philippines.
 2017 USPSA Asia Pacific Championship (upcoming): Monday to Sunday November 27 to December 3, 36 stages at the Front Sight Shooting Range, Manila, Philippines.

Another notable event was the 2016 PSMOC Shooters Olympix held December 8 to 11 at the Front Sight Shooting Range, where the USPSA part of the match consisted of 18 stages.

Champions 
The following is a list of current and past USPSA Asia Pacific Champions.

Overall category

Junior category

Senior category

Super Senior category

See also 
 USPSA Handgun Championship
 USPSA Multigun Championship

References

External links 
 2017 USPSA ASIA Pacific Championship - Facebook page
 Match Video from the 2016 USPSA Asia Pacific Championship - YouTube

Handgun shooting sports
United States sport-related lists